Edith Diaz (October 23, 1949 – December 19, 2009) was a Puerto Rican actress known for the roles in film, television, and stage. She co-founded the Screen Actors Guild's Ethnic Minorities Committee in 1972.

Diaz was born in Mayaguez, Puerto Rico. She studied under noted acting teacher, Stella Adler, and at the Actors Studio in the New York City. Her film credits included Born on the Fourth of July (1989), Sister Act (1992), Sister Act 2: Back in the Habit (1993), Nick of Time (1995), and her final appearance, Oh Baby! (2008).

On television, Diaz appeared in the short-lived 1975-76 CBS television series, Popi, which starred Hector Elizondo. Popi, which aired on CBS for eleven episodes, was one of the first television series on American network television to feature a Hispanic theme and cast. Her other television credits included guest roles on Quincy, M.E., Police Woman, St. Elsewhere, All in the Family, The F.B.I., Barney Miller and The Twilight Zone. In 1991, she played Desi Arnaz's mother, Dolores, in the television movie, Lucy & Desi: Before the Laughter, on CBS. In the 1973 episode "A Bullet for El Diablo", on Hawaii Five-O, Diaz appeared in a dual role as half-sisters Rita Salazar and Maria Ramos.

Diaz co-founded the Screen Actors Guild Ethnic Minorities Committee in 1972 with Henry Darrow, Carmen Zapata and Ricardo Montalbán.

Edith Diaz died of heart failure on December 19, 2009, at a nursing home in North Hollywood, Los Angeles, California, at the age of 60. Actress Miluka Rivera, who had served with her on the SAG Ethnic Minorities Committee, called Diaz a "gifted performer, a union Latino rights activist and a loving friend."

Filmography

References

External links

1949 births
2009 deaths
20th-century Puerto Rican actresses
American film actresses
American television actresses
People from Mayagüez, Puerto Rico
Actresses from Los Angeles
20th-century American actresses